Wushi (Babessi) is a Grassfields language of Cameroon.

It might be the same language as adjacent, unattested Nshi across the border in Nigeria.

References

Ring languages
Languages of Cameroon